Pullen Island is a snow-covered island 5 nautical miles (9 km) long, which rises to 495 meters at its north end, lying near the center of Violante Inlet along the east coast of Palmer Land. Discovered by the United States Antarctic Service in a flight from East Base on December 30, 1940, it is named for William A. Pullen, Aviation Machinist's Mate at the East Base.

See also 
 List of Antarctic and sub-Antarctic islands

Islands of Palmer Land